The Best of Joy Division is a compilation album of material from Joy Division.  It was released  and the UK version includes The Complete BBC Recordings as a bonus disc. The US release is a single disc. The Best of Joy Division reached #97 in April 2008 in Australia, which marks only their second appearance on the ARIA Charts after Substance reached #53 in 1988.

Track listing

Bonus CD – The Complete BBC Recordings
 "Exercise One" (Peel Session) – 2:32
 "Insight" (Peel Session) – 3:53
 "She's Lost Control" (Peel Session) – 4:11
 "Transmission" (Peel Session) – 3:58
 "Love Will Tear Us Apart" (Peel Session) – 3:25
 "Twenty Four Hours" (Peel Session) – 4:10
 "Colony" (Peel Session) – 4:05
 "Sound of Music" (Peel Session) – 4:27
 "Transmission" (live) – 3:18
 "She's Lost Control" (live) – 3:44
 "Ian Curtis & Stephen Morris interviewed by Richard Skinner" – 3:3

Notes
 Tracks 1 to 4 first released on The Peel Sessions EP in 1986.
 Tracks 5 to 8 first released on The Peel Sessions EP in 1987.
 Tracks 9 to 11 first released on the Joy Division The Complete BBC Recordings album in 2000.

Charts

Certifications

References

External links
 

Joy Division compilation albums
2008 greatest hits albums
Albums produced by Martin Hannett
2008 live albums
Rhino Records compilation albums
London Records compilation albums
London Records live albums
Rhino Records live albums
Joy Division live albums